Paul Tottle (born January 1958) is a justice on the Supreme Court of Western Australia as of August 2015. Prior to this, Tottle founded the commercial law firm Tottle Partners in 1995.

References

1958 births
Living people
Australian jurists
Judges of the Supreme Court of Western Australia